The 1936 United States presidential election in Louisiana took place on November 3, 1936, as part of the 1936 United States presidential election. Louisiana voters chose ten representatives, or electors, to the Electoral College, who voted for president and vice president.

Louisiana was won by incumbent President Franklin D. Roosevelt (D–New York), running with Vice President John Nance Garner, with 88.82 percent of the popular vote, against Governor Alf Landon (R–Kansas), running with Frank Knox, with 11.16 percent of the popular vote.

By percentage of the popular vote won, Louisiana was Roosevelt's third-best state, behind only South Carolina (98.57 percent) and Mississippi (97.06 percent).

Results

Results by parish

See also
 United States presidential elections in Louisiana

References

Louisiana
1936
1936 Louisiana elections